Placopleurus is an extinct genus of prehistoric ray-finned fish from the Triassic period of Italy, Slovenia, and Switzerland.

See also

 Prehistoric fish
 List of prehistoric bony fish

References

Peltopleuriformes